The Loft Historic District South is a national historic district in Baltimore, Maryland, United States. It includes seven large brick manufacturing buildings on both sides of the 500 block of West Pratt Street near the University of Maryland campus in downtown Baltimore. Of the seven buildings, four have been converted into a loft apartment building complex known as the Greenehouse. The district includes the Sonneborn Building.

The Loft Historic District South was added to the National Register of Historic Places in 1985.

References

External links
, including photo dated 1984, at Maryland Historical Trust
Boundary Map of the Loft Historic District South, Baltimore City, at Maryland Historical Trust

Historic districts on the National Register of Historic Places in Baltimore
Romanesque Revival architecture in Maryland